The Timoshenko Medal is an award given annually by the American Society of Mechanical Engineers (ASME) to an individual 
"in recognition of distinguished contributions to the field of applied mechanics."

The Timoshenko Medal, widely regarded as the highest international award in the field of applied mechanics, was established in 1957 in honor of Stephen Timoshenko, world-renowned authority in the field.  The Medal "commemorates his contributions as author and teacher."

The actual award is a bronze medal and honorarium.  
The first award was given in 1957 to Stephen Prokofyevich Timoshenko.

Nomination procedure
The Timoshenko Medal Committee consists of the five recent Timoshenko Medalists, the five members of the executive committee of the ASME International Applied Mechanics Division (AMD), and the five recent past chairs of the AMD. See the list of current members of the Committee 
Upon receiving recommendations from the international community of applied mechanics, the Committee nominates a single medalist every year.  This nomination is subsequently approved by the ASME; no case has been reported that the ASME has ever overruled a nomination of the Timoshenko Medal Committee.

Acceptance speech
Every year, at the Applied Mechanics Dinner at the ASME winter annual meeting, the Timoshenko Medalist of the year delivers a lecture. Taken as a whole, these lectures provide a long perspective of the field of applied mechanics, as well as capsules of the lives of extraordinary individuals. A project has been initiated to post all Timoshenko Medal Lectures online.

Timoshenko Medal recipients
2022 – Michael A. Sutton, University of South Carolina, USA.
2021 – Huajian Gao, Nanyang Technological University, Singapore.
2020 – Mary Cunningham Boyce, Columbia University, USA.
2019 – J. N. Reddy, Texas A&M University, USA.
2018 – Ares J. Rosakis, California Institute of Technology, USA.
2017 – Viggo Tvergaard, Technical University of Denmark
2016 – Raymond Ogden, University of Glasgow, Scotland, UK.
2015 – Michael Ortiz, California Institute of Technology, USA.
2014 – Robert McMeeking, UC Santa Barbara, USA.
2013 – Richard M. Christensen, Stanford University, USA.
2012 – Subra Suresh, National Science Foundation (NSF)
2011 – Alan Needleman,  The University of North Texas (United States)
2010 – Wolfgang Knauss,  Caltech (United States)
2009 – Zdenek P. Bazant, Northwestern University (United States)
2008 – Sia Nemat-Nasser, Department of Mechanical and Aerospace Engineering, University of California, San Diego (United States)
2007 – Thomas J. R. Hughes, Institute for Computational Engineering and Sciences, The University of Texas at Austin (United States)
2006 – Kenneth L. Johnson, The University of Cambridge (United Kingdom)	
2005 – Grigory Isaakovich Barenblatt, Department of Mathematics, University of California, Berkeley (United States)
2004 – Morton E. Gurtin, Department of Mathematical Sciences, Carnegie Mellon University (United States)
2003 – L. Ben Freund Brown University (United States)
2002 – John W. Hutchinson, Harvard University (United States)
2001 – Ted Belytschko, Northwestern University
2000 – Rodney J. Clifton
1999 – Anatol Roshko
1998 – Olgierd C. Zienkiewicz, Imperial College London, Institute for Numerical Methods in Engineering at the University of Wales (United Kingdom)
1997 – John R. Willis
1996 – J. Tinsley Oden, Institute for Computational Engineering and Sciences, The University of Texas at Austin (United States)
1995 – Daniel D. Joseph, University of Minnesota (United States)
1994 – James R. Rice, Harvard University (United States)
1993 – John L. Lumley, Cornell University (United States)
1992 – Jan D. Achenbach, Northwestern University (United States)
1991 – Yuan-Cheng Fung, Department of Bioengineering, University of California, San Diego (United States)
1990 – Stephen H. Crandall, Massachusetts Institute of Technology (United States)
1989 – Bernard Budiansky, Harvard University (United States)
1988 – George K. Batchelor
1987 – Ronald S. Rivlin
1986 – George Rankine Irwin
1985 – Eli Sternberg
1984 – Joseph B. Keller
1983 – Daniel C. Drucker
1982 – John W. Miles
1981 – John H. Argyris, Imperial College London (UK), University of Stuttgart (Germany)
1980 – Paul M. Naghdi
1979 – Jerald L. Ericksen
1978 – George F. Carrier, Harvard University (United States)
1977 – John D. Eshelby
1976 – Erastus H. Lee
1975 – Chia-Chiao Lin
1974 – Albert E. Green
1973 – Eric Reissner
1972 – Jacob P. Den Hartog
1971 – Howard W. Emmons, Harvard University (United States)
1970 – James J. Stoker
1969 – Jakob Ackeret
1968 – Warner T. Koiter
1967 – Hillel Poritsky
1966 – William Prager
1965 – Sydney Goldstein
1964 – Raymond D. Mindlin, Columbia University (United States)
1963 – Michael James Lighthill
1962 – Maurice A. Biot
1961 – James N. Goodier
1960 – Cornelius B. Biezeno
   – Richard Grammel
1959 – Sir Richard Southwell, University of Cambridge, Imperial College London (UK)
1958 – Arpad L. Nadai
   – Sir Geoffrey Taylor
   – Theodore von Karman
1957 – Stephen P. Timoshenko

See also

 List of engineering awards
 List of mechanical engineering awards
 List of awards named after people
 American Society of Mechanical Engineers
 Applied mechanics
 Applied Mechanics Division
 Mechanician

Footnotes

 Timoshenko Lectures: A project has started to make the Timoshenko Medalist Lectures available on-line

External links
Information for nomination
Honors & Awards - Timoshenko Medal, ASME official page, where forms for nomination can be obtained.
Homepage of the ASME International Applied Mechanics Division

Mechanical engineering awards
Awards established in 1957